Nelson Castro Velásquez (born March 29, 1974 in Roldanillo, Valle del Cauca) is a retired  weightlifter from Colombia, who competed for his native country at three consecutive Summer Olympics, starting in 1996. He twice won a medal at the Pan American Games in the Men's Flyweight (– 56 kg) division.

References
sports-reference

1974 births
Living people
Sportspeople from Valle del Cauca Department
Colombian male weightlifters
Olympic weightlifters of Colombia
Weightlifters at the 1996 Summer Olympics
Weightlifters at the 2000 Summer Olympics
Weightlifters at the 2004 Summer Olympics
Weightlifters at the 1999 Pan American Games
Weightlifters at the 2003 Pan American Games
Pan American Games gold medalists for Colombia
Pan American Games silver medalists for Colombia
Pan American Games medalists in weightlifting
Central American and Caribbean Games bronze medalists for Colombia
Competitors at the 2006 Central American and Caribbean Games
Central American and Caribbean Games medalists in weightlifting
Medalists at the 1999 Pan American Games
Medalists at the 2003 Pan American Games
20th-century Colombian people
21st-century Colombian people